exactEarth Ltd is a Canadian company that specializes in data services that deliver real-time global location-based maritime vessel tracking information utilizing patented satellite AIS detection technology.

exactEarth provides satellite AIS data services to commercial markets as well as government customers in India, Canada, United States, Australia and across Europe.

Founded in 2009, exactEarth is based in Cambridge, Ontario, Canada. The company was publicly traded until 2021 when Spire Global acquired the company.

History 
In 2005, COM DEV International first recognized that the AIS messages being transmitted by major ships could potentially be received from space. COM DEV validated its AIS detection capability through aircraft trials in 2007 and launched a nanosatellite (EV0) in April 2008.

exactEarth commenced commercial operations in June 2009. In September 2010, Hisdesat acquired a 27% equity interest in the company for a cash investment of approximately CA$15 million, with COM DEV retaining a 73% equity interest.

On 23 June 2015, exactEarth filed a Preliminary Prospectus with Canadian Securities Administrators, announcing their intentions to launch an Initial public offering (IPO). However, on 5 November 2015, exactEarth's largest shareholder, COM DEV, announced plans for an acquisition by Honeywell with exactEarth spinning out into its own publicly traded company. exactEarth's prospectus was abandoned. COM DEV shareholders approved the acquisition on 21 January 2016, with each COM DEV shareholder receiving 0.1977 exactEarth stock for every COM DEV stock held. Final court approval of the acquisition came on 25 January 2016.

On 9 February 2016, exactEarth became a publicly traded company, trading on the Toronto Stock Exchange with the ticker symbol of XCT. For a while, HISDESAT Servicios Estratégicos S.A. was the largest stakeholder. However, in December 2021, the company was acquired by Spire Global and its stock were de-listed from the TSX.

Satellites 
On 8 June 2015, exactEarth announced a partnership with Harris Corporation to build 58 AIS detecting payloads to be launched on board the Iridium NEXT satellite constellation. It is expected that this constellation will provide global average revisit times and customer data latency of less than one minute.

As of October 2015, exactEarth operates a satellite constellation consisting of 9 satellites.

Projects 
exactEarth satellite AIS data was used in security efforts at the 2010 Olympics and Paralympics.

exactEarth satellite AIS data was used in the ship emission modelling project of the Finnish Meteorological Institute.

exactEarth satellite AIS data aids ScanEx RDC in identifying illegal shipping within marine protected natural areas.

Awards 
In 2009, exactEarth technology was recognized at the Ontario Premier's Innovation Awards for developing a satellite system for their work on satellite AIS.

References

External links 
 Official Website

Telecommunications companies established in 2009
Companies formerly listed on the Toronto Stock Exchange
Commercial Earth observation satellites
2009 establishments in Ontario